Blue Rodeo is a made for television drama film adapted from the novel by Jo-Ann Mapson.  It first aired on CBS as a Sunday night movie of the week on October 20, 1996.  Blue Rodeo was directed by Peter Werner and stars Ann-Margret and Kris Kristofferson.

Credited Cast

External links 
 

CBS network films
1996 drama films
1996 films
1996 television films
Films directed by Peter Werner
1990s English-language films